Ahmad Agha Fadhelaldin Agha Al-Asali Duzdar was mayor of Jerusalem and Governor of Jerusalem from 1838 to as late as 1863.

In 1838 Ahmad Agha accompanied David Roberts from Jerusalem to the river Jordan, together with 4,000 Christian pilgrims.

His name appears in a petition by Muhammad Sharif in 1840 demanding that "the Jews must not be enabled to carry out the paving, and they must be cautioned against raising their voices and displaying their books at the Western wall."

His official title was 'Ottoman Governor of Jerusalem'. He was known for his dealings with Moses Montefiore, having sold him the land to acquire Mishkenot Sha'ananim, which was built in 1860.

In 2005, the Turkish government in consultation with the Wakf built a marker for his grave which is in the southern end of the Mamilla Cemetery in west Jerusalem.

Gallery

References

Arabs in Ottoman Palestine
Palestinian politicians
Year of birth unknown
Place of birth unknown
Year of death unknown
Place of death unknown
19th-century people from the Ottoman Empire
19th-century politicians
Mayors of Jerusalem